Do or Not (stylized as DO or NOT) is the fourth Japanese extended play by South Korean boy group Pentagon, released by Universal Music Japan and Cube Entertainment. Originally set to be released on June 23, 2021, the EP was released digitally on June 14, 2021, with physical editions still released on June 23. The EP contains Japanese versions of songs previously released "Do or Not", "Daisy" and "Boy In Time", as well as two original Japanese tracks, "Don't Worry 'Bout Me" and "Dazzling" which were composed by members Kino and Yuto, respectively.

Background
On May 12, Cube Entertainment announced that Pentagon will release their 4th mini album Do or Not in Japan on June 23. Starting May 13, Pentagon individual images were posted on their official Japan Twitter account. On May 20, Universal Music Japan revealed the album's tracklist through their website. It will be released in three versions: limited edition A with a 40 pages photo book, limited edition B with a 28 pages photo book, and the regular edition with only a CD containing all 5 songs. An audio snippet of the mini album, briefly showcasing each track, was released on June 9. On June 11, it was announced that Do or Not would be pre-released digitally on June 14, while the release date for the physical versions of the EP would remain the same.

Track listing
Credits adapted from Apple Music and Melon.

Charts

Release history

References 

2021 EPs
Cube Entertainment EPs
Japanese-language EPs
Pentagon (South Korean band) EPs
Universal Music Japan albums
Albums produced by Hui (singer)
Albums produced by Kino (singer)
Albums produced by Yuto
Albums produced by Wooseok